The 1960 UMass Redmen football team represented the University of Massachusetts Amherst in the 1960 NCAA College Division football season as a member of the Yankee Conference. The team was coached by Chuck Studley and played its home games at Alumni Field in Amherst, Massachusetts. The 1960 season was Studley's first and only as coach of the Minutemen. It was also the team's first as conference champions. UMass finished the season with a record of 7–2 overall and 3–1 in conference play.

Schedule

References

UMass
UMass Minutemen football seasons
Yankee Conference football champion seasons
UMass Redmen football